Marochkovo is a rural locality (a village) in Nagornoye Rural Settlement, Petushinsky District, Vladimir Oblast, Russia. The population was 13 as of 2010.

Geography 
Marochkovo is located 16 km west of Petushki (the district's administrative centre) by road. Yemelyantsevo is the nearest rural locality.

References 

Rural localities in Petushinsky District